The Embassy of the People’s Republic of China in the Commonwealth of Australia is the embassy of China in Canberra, Australia.

The embassy opened in 1990. During its construction in the late 1980s, members of the Australian Security Intelligence Organisation and the American National Security Agency "covertly installed an elaborate system of fibre optic bugging devices". This became public in 1995.

, a new embassy building was under construction. Paul Daley suggests that "Beijing's growing presence in this highly symbolic part of the city seems an appropriate, if unwelcome, reflection of Australia's international diplomatic, defence and trade priorities.

References

China
Canberra
Australia–China relations
Buildings and structures completed in 1990